Tama William Potaka (born 1976) is a New Zealand politician and Member of Parliament in the House of Representatives representing the Hamilton West electorate. He is a member of the National Party and was chief executive of Ngāi Tai ki Tāmaki before entering Parliament.

Early life and family
Potaka was born in Raetihi in 1976. He has Māori ancestry through both of his parents, who were schoolteachers, and he affiliates to Ngāti Hauiti, Whanganui, Taranaki, and Ngāti Toa. He was educated at Huntley School and Te Aute College, where he was classmates with Julian Wilcox, Aidan Warren, Billy Weepu, Karl Te Nana and Alistair Toto and became dux in 1993. He received Bachelor of Arts and Bachelor of Laws degrees from Victoria University of Wellington in 1999, and with a scholarship earned a Master of Laws from Columbia University. He passed the bar exam and became an attorney at Simpson Thacher & Bartlett.

Potaka married Ariana Paul in 2008, and they have three children.

Potaka worked for Rudd, Watts and Stone (now Minter Ellison), various public policy roles, with Lake Taupō Funds, and Bell Gully. Potaka then spent seven years based in Hamilton, working as general manager corporate services for Tainui Group Holdings. He subsequently moved back to Auckland where he was a senior advisor at the New Zealand Superannuation Fund. He was appointed chief executive officer of Ngāi Tai ki Tāmaki Trust in 2020. In 2021, he was chosen as one of four lead negotiators for the Mōkai Pātea Treaty of Waitangi claim.

Political career

On 6 November 2022, Potaka was selected as the National Party candidate for the 2022 Hamilton West by-election caused by the resignation of independent MP Gaurav Sharma who had been expelled from the Labour Party. On 10 December 2022, Potaka won the election, beating Labour candidate Georgie Dansey. Potaka gained 6974 votes compared to  Dansey's 4541, a margin of 2433.

On 19 January 2023, Potaka was named as National's spokesperson for Māori development and associate spokesperson for housing.

References

1976 births
Living people
People from Raetihi
New Zealand National Party MPs
New Zealand MPs for North Island electorates
Members of the New Zealand House of Representatives
21st-century New Zealand politicians
Ngāti Hauiti people
Māori MPs
People educated at Huntley School, New Zealand
People educated at Te Aute College
Victoria University of Wellington alumni
Columbia University alumni
Simpson Thacher & Bartlett people
Ngāti Toa people
Taranaki (iwi)